The Helmet Catch was an American football play involving New York Giants quarterback Eli Manning and wide receiver David Tyree in the final two minutes of Super Bowl XLII on February 3, 2008. It featured Manning escaping from the grasp of three New England Patriots defensive players and throwing a forward pass, followed by Tyree making a leaping catch by pressing the ball against his helmet. NFL Films' Steve Sabol called it "the greatest play the Super Bowl has ever produced". The play was also named by NFL Films as "The Play of the Decade (2000s)". It was also the final catch of Tyree's NFL career.

Background
Tyree had been used primarily on special teams and had only 4 receptions for 35 yards and no touchdowns during the 2007 regular season. Although Tyree was seldom used as a receiver during the regular season, he caught the Giants' first touchdown of the Super Bowl early in the fourth quarter, giving his team a 10–7 lead. On their next drive, the Patriots scored a touchdown on a pass from Tom Brady to Randy Moss to take a 14–10 lead with 2:42 remaining in the game. 

On their next possession, the Giants faced a 3rd & 5 from their own 44-yard line with 1:15 remaining. On the previous play, Patriots' cornerback Asante Samuel dropped what could have been a game-sealing interception.

Play

Manning was given the play call "62 Sail-Y Union" from the Giants' playbook in hopes of connecting with a receiver downfield. On third and 5 from the Giants' 44 yard line, Manning took the snap in the shotgun formation and immediately faced pressure from the Patriots defensive ends Richard Seymour, Jarvis Green, and linebacker Adalius Thomas. Green grabbed Manning by the shoulder while Seymour grabbed him by the back of his jersey and attempted to pull him down for a sack. Manning, however, was able to stay on his feet and duck under the arms of the Patriot defenders before scrambling backwards into space at around the 34 yard line. Linebackers Mike Vrabel and Junior Seau attempted to sack Manning, but he was able to throw the ball towards David Tyree. After Eli Manning released the football, he was immediately hit by Mike Vrabel. He threw the ball downfield to Tyree at the 24 yard line of the Patriots. Fox announcer Troy Aikman said after the play, "I don't know how he got out of there." Had Manning been sacked, the Giants would have faced a fourth down with around 8 yards to go for a first, and would have needed to convert for the second time on the drive to keep their chances to win alive (halfback Brandon Jacobs converted on a 4th and 1 three plays earlier in the drive).

Tyree was unable to run his intended route due to a jam by Ellis Hobbs. Starting cornerback Asante Samuel was on the left side of the field, walking to the line of scrimmage right before the snap to jam Plaxico Burress. Tyree saw Manning under pressure and instead came back towards the line to give Manning an option down the field, stopping at the 25 yard line. As the ball arrived Tyree made a fully extended leap for it, while Patriots strong safety Rodney Harrison, also leaping fully extended in tight coverage, attempted to knock it down. Initially, Tyree caught the ball with both hands, but a swipe by Harrison's arm caused his left hand to be knocked off the ball. However, Tyree was able to secure possession of the ball by pressing it against the top of his helmet with his right hand. Harrison pulled him down, and Tyree landed on top of him with the ball still pressed against his helmet. Free safety James Sanders and cornerbacks Asante Samuel and Ellis Hobbs were there, but neither had the time to assist Harrison in trying to prevent Tyree from making the catch.

The play gained 32 yards for the Giants and gave them a first down with 58 seconds left. After the play, the Giants called timeout. Four plays later, Plaxico Burress scored the touchdown that won the game for the Giants, 17–14. It was the Patriots' only loss of the season, preventing them from finishing with a perfect 19–0 record.

Nickname
Like other famous plays in the NFL, this play has been given nicknames, but largely due to two separate, unique occurrences in the play, consensus was not reached on a single name for some time. In 2009, readers of the New York Daily News voted on nicknaming the play "Catch-42" as the favored name in reference to Super Bowl XLII and the kind of coverage the Patriots deployed against the Giants' four-receiver set. Since then, David Tyree has adopted the "Catch-42" nickname as well as ESPN.com. Other proposed nicknames include "The Escape and the Helmet Catch", "The E-mmaculate Connection" (a pun on the Immaculate Reception; the 'E' standing for Eli), "The Double Miracle", and "The Reception that Ended Perfection". "The Great Escape" was used by U.S. President George W. Bush during the Giants' White House visit. "David and Eliath" was also suggested by David Tyree due to biblical reference.  Bill Simmons named it "The Helmet Catch" five days after the game, and as time passed by, this became the consensus name for the play.

Aftermath
The catch won the 2008 Best Play ESPY Award.  The award ceremony featured a spoof by host Justin Timberlake, who "revealed" that he had left gum on David Tyree's helmet, which helped him catch the pass (since he caught it close to the top of his helmet). During the acceptance speech, Tyree jokingly stated, "Justin, thanks for the gum." Eli Manning also jokingly thanked his offensive line, "for giving me zero pass protection."

Tyree would never catch another pass in the NFL.  He missed the following season with a training camp injury and played just 10 games in 2009, recording no receptions, before announcing his retirement in 2010.

In an NFC Divisional playoff game against the defending Super Bowl XLV champion Green Bay Packers on January 15, 2012, Manning threw a Hail Mary pass at the end of the first half, which was caught in the end zone by Hakeem Nicks, giving the Giants a 20–10 lead. Nicks caught the ball by cradling it against his head, which prompted commentators Joe Buck and Troy Aikman to note the similarity to Tyree's catch. Coincidentally, Buck and Aikman were also the commentators of Super Bowl XLII. The Giants would go on to beat the Packers 37–20, as well as win another Super Bowl against the New England Patriots.

Legacy

Fox Sports lists Eli Manning's pass to David Tyree as the greatest play in Super Bowl history; editor Adrian Hasenmeyer called the play "an insult to physics and Albert Einstein". NBC Sports and NFL.com have also listed the play as the greatest Super Bowl play of all time. NFL Films founder Steve Sabol compared Manning to Fran Tarkenton and said that the play "defied logic, history, gravity and just about anything else you care to mention".

For the NFL’s 100th season, the play was declared #3 in greatest 100 plays in NFL history.

References

External links
Video from NFL.com includes Top 10 Super Bowl Plays: Tyree's helmet catch, David Tyree's Helmet Catch, and David Tyree helmet catch which show this play from various angles.

Super Bowl plays
New York Giants postseason
New England Patriots postseason
2007 National Football League season
February 2008 sports events in the United States
2008 in sports in Arizona
American football incidents